The 2017–18 season is the 89rd season of the Kuala Lumpur League, which is a Malaysian football competition featuring semi-professional and amateur clubs from Kuala Lumpur. JMM FC are the defending champions.

Teams
For 2017–18 season, there are 62 teams will compete in the league, including 48 sides from the Division 1 and Division 2. Top two team from the Super League will promoted to Malaysia M4 League for 2019 season.

Super League

League table

Division 1

League table

Group A

Group B

Knock-out stage

Bracket

Quarter-finals

Semi-finals

Final

References

4
Malay